Delta unguiculatum is a species of potter wasp from Europe and Africa.

References

External links
 
 

Potter wasps
Insects described in 1789